The 1889 season was the sixth season of regional competitive association football in Australia. The were two league competitions and two cup competitions fielded by Northern District British Football Association (Northern NSW) and the South British Football Soccer Association (New South Wales).

League competitions

(Note: figures in parentheses display the club's competition record as winners/runners-up.)

Cup competitions

(Note: figures in parentheses display the club's competition record as winners/runners-up.)

See also
 Soccer in Australia

References

Seasons in Australian soccer
1889 in Australian sport
N
Australian soccer